Wei Sijiong (1873-1922), courtesy name (zi) Fuou was a former head of the Jiangxi Province Bureau of Civil Affairs, and a member of the National Assembly of the Republic of China. His name is often falsely stated to be Siling.

Wei, from Jiangxi, studied economics in Japan during the beginning of the 20th century, and he was involved in the 1911 Xinhai Revolution. When he met Sai Jinhua, he was the head of Jiangxi Province's tax authority.

On 20 June 1918 he and Sai Jinhua married in Shanghai. Sai Jinhua adopted a hao (an art name), Weizhao Lingfei, a combination of her family name with that of her husband, in order to illustrate her devotion to him. The couple moved to Peking (Beijing). Wei Sijiong died shortly after Sai Jinhua's mother's 1922 death, and his family refused to allow Sai Jinhua to share his property.

References
  Minden, Stephan von. Die merkwürdige Geschichte der Sai Jinhua.: Historisch-philologische Untersuchung zur Entstehung und Verbreitung einer Legende aus der Zeit des Boxeraufstandes. (Volume 70 of Münchener ostasiatische Studien) Franz Steiner Verlag, 1994. , 9783515066150.
 Wan, Xianchu. Translation: Poon Shuk Wah. "Sai Jinhua." In: Lee, Lily Xiao Hong and A. D. Stefanowska (editors of entire work). Ho, Clara Wing-chung (The Qing Period Editor). Biographical Dictionary of Chinese Women The Qing Period, 1844-1911. M.E. Sharpe, January 1, 1998. , 9780765618276.
 Zhang, Wenxian. "Sai Jinhua." In: Ditmore, Melissa Hope (editor). Encyclopedia of Prostitution and Sex Work, Volume 2. Greenwood Publishing Group, January 1, 2006. , 9780313329708.

Notes

1873 births
1922 deaths
Politicians from Fuzhou, Jiangxi
Republic of China politicians from Jiangxi